Yeh Jiunn-rong (born October 1958) is a Taiwanese academic and politician.

Early life
Yeh received his bachelor's and master's degrees in law from National Taiwan University (NTU) in 1981 and 1985, respectively. He went on to study at Yale University in the United States, earning master's and doctoral degrees in law in 1986 and 1988, respectively.

Early career
Yeh was an associate professor on the Faculty of Law of NTU from 1988 to 1993 and served as professor from 1993 onward. He was also a visiting professor and scholar to Columbia University, Duke University, Hong Kong University and University of Toronto during 1995–2000. He was also a visiting lecturer to the Law School of Zhejiang University in 2011–2012.

Political career
Yeh led the Research, Development and Evaluation Commission from 2004 to 2006. He returned to public service in 2016, taking office as Minister of the Interior on 20 May. He was named Minister of Education in July 2018. Yeh resigned as education minister on 25 December 2018, a day after announcing that the ministry confirmed Kuan Chung-ming's selection as president of National Taiwan University, outstanding since January 2018.

References

1958 births
Taiwanese Ministers of the Interior
Living people
National Taiwan University alumni
Yale University alumni
Academic staff of the National Taiwan University
Politicians of the Republic of China on Taiwan from Taipei
Taiwanese Ministers of Education